The UNLV Rebels football program is a college football team that represents the University of Nevada, Las Vegas (UNLV). The team is a member of the Mountain West Conference, which is a Division I Bowl Subdivision (formerly Division I-A) conference of the National Collegiate Athletics Association (NCAA). The program, which began on September 14, 1968, plays its home games at Allegiant Stadium in Paradise, Nevada.

History

Early history
In 1967, Nevada Southern University announced that they would field a collegiate football program beginning on September 14, 1968 and announced that the team would be a Division II Independent and that Bill Ireland would be the program's first head coach. The Rebels played their first game of their inaugural season against the St. Mary's Gaels at Cashman Field in Las Vegas. The Rebels won the game, defeating the Gaels 27–20 in front of 8,000 fans. The Rebels remained undefeated until the last game of the season, losing to the Cal Lutheran Kingsmen, 13–17, as the Rebels finished their inaugural campaign 8–1. The following year, the Rebels played their first game against in-state rival Nevada, losing to the Wolf Pack 28–30. UNLV gained revenge, defeating Nevada the following year, 42–30, in the first year that the Fremont Cannon was awarded. On September 25, 1971, the Rebels played their first game against a Division I school, when they played Utah State of the Pacific Coast Athletic Association (PCAA), ultimately losing 7–27. On October 23, 1971, the Rebels opened their new home, Las Vegas Stadium, against Weber State, losing 17–30. At the end of the 1972 season with a disappointing 1–10 record, Ireland announced he was stepping down, leaving the Rebels with a 26–23–1 record.

Ireland was replaced by Ron Meyer before the start of the 1973 season and Meyer led the Rebels back to powerhouse status with an 8–3 record, including their first victory over a major college opponent, thrashing Marshall 31–9. The Rebels continued their strong campaign, breaking the national Division II top-10 and announcing their first All-American, running back Mike Thomas, who ran for the Division II national rushing title with 1,741 and setting nine school records in the process. The Rebels' success continued in 1974 with the only undefeated season in school history, finishing 11–0 and ranking second in the national Division II polls, the highest any Rebels football team has ever placed. The Rebels embarked on their first post-season journey in a national quarterfinal against Alcorn State, defeating the Braves 35–22 in Las Vegas. The Rebels memorable season ended in the national semifinals in the Grantland Rice Bowl, losing to Delaware 11–49. Meyer left the program in 1976 to take the head coaching position at collegiate powerhouse SMU.

The move to Division I
Former Boise State coach Tony Knap took over the Rebels in 1976, after Ron Meyer's departure. Knap was able to continue the Rebels prior success under Meyer, with a 9–3 record, a ranking of 7th in the nation and a berth in the Division II playoffs, ultimately losing to Akron 6–27 in the national quarterfinals. After ten years as a Division II independent, the program made the jump to the Division I level in 1978, independent of any conference affiliation. On September 9, the Rebels played their first game as a Division I school, losing to Washington State 7–34. The Rebels defeated their first major college opponent away from Las Vegas, with a 33–6 victory over Colorado State in Fort Collins. At the end of the season, the Rebels made a trip to Yokohama, Japan to compete against college football powerhouse Brigham Young, losing 28–24. Even with the hard end to the season, the Rebels still produced a memorable year, going 7–4 in their first campaign at the Division I level. The 1981 season proved to be the last in Knap's tenure at UNLV, as he retired from coaching after a year of accomplishments, including the Rebels' first appearance in the ABC's Regional Game of the Week (a 21–45 loss at Wyoming), a 45–41 upset of 8th-ranked BYU in Provo, Utah and securing the programs 100th win (27–20 at UTEP) in El Paso, Texas.

The 1982 season was a big year in UNLV football history as the program hired its fourth head coach, Harvey Hyde and the Rebels became affiliated with a college athletic conference when they joined the Pacific Coast Athletic Association (PCAA). The Rebels' first PCAA game was a 27–29 loss to Pacific on October 2. It took the entire season before the Rebels won their first conference game, a 42–23 victory against Cal State Fullerton on November 27. The Rebels won their first conference championship in 1984 as the Randall Cunningham-led Rebels finished 11–2, including the program's first trip to a bowl game, a 30–13 victory over Toledo in the California Bowl in Fresno, California. Hyde stepped down after the 1985 season and a 5–5–1 record when the NCAA discovered that several players on the 1983 and 1984 Rebels were ineligible. The Rebels were forced to forfeit their entire 1983 and 1984 seasons, including the California Bowl.

Wayne Nunnely became the program's fifth head coach on September 20, 1986, and he coached the Rebels to a 17–7 victory over Wisconsin in front of the first sellout crowd in Silver Bowl Stadium history, a then record 32,207 fans. One of Nunnely's key players was Elbert "Ickey" Woods, the first Rebel and PCAA running back to win the national Division I rushing title, as he rushed for 1,658 yards and was drafted by the Cincinnati Bengals in the 1988 NFL Draft.

1994 was another memorable season for the Rebels, as wide receiver Randy Gatewood set two single-game receiving records in a 38–48 loss to Idaho on September 17. The Rebels then stunned the heavily favored Nevada, 32–27 to win a share of the Big West Conference championship, the program's second title (but the first one they were allowed to keep). The Rebels then defeated Central Michigan 52–24 in the Las Vegas Bowl on their home field.

In 1996, the Rebels along with San Jose State left the Big West Conference and became a member of the heavily expanded Western Athletic Conference. The league announced that it would hold a championship game for the top team in each of the two divisions at the end of each season and that the game would be held at Sam Boyd Stadium in Las Vegas. The Rebels lost their first WAC game, 65–17 to Air Force on September 7. The Rebels finally won their first WAC game in a 44–42 shootout against San Diego State on November 16, in a game in which freshman quarterback John Denton set an NCAA freshman record for passing yards with 503. Although the Rebels finished 1–11, Denton still set ten NCAA freshman records. On October 17, 1998, UNLV played their first overtime game, losing to San Diego State 17–20. In 1999, the Rebels finished with the program's first winless season, but had their first consensus First Team All-American in punter Joe Kristosik, who averaged a nationally-best 46.2 yard per punt average.

1999–present
In 1999, the Rebels made headlines, first by leaving the WAC with seven other schools to form the Mountain West Conference, but also by announcing that the program had hired legendary collegiate and professional coach John Robinson as their eighth head coach. The school would repeat its conference hardships in the Mountain West as they lost their conference opener on September 25, 14–52 to Utah. The Rebels won their first Mountain West game on October 9, 35–32 against Wyoming. Although 1999 was a rough year, a UNLV win in week two featured one of the most improbable endings in college football history. The Rebels trailed on the road against Baylor 24–21 with ten seconds left. Baylor had the ball at the UNLV five yard line and UNLV was out of time outs. A kneel down would have given Baylor the victory, but Baylor chose to run the ball, fumbled and UNLV's Kevin Thomas recovered and returned it 99 yards for a touchdown and a 27–24 Rebel win. 2000 seemed to be the year in which Rebels football would finally turn around, as the Rebels made numerous gains to become a competitor for the Mountain West crown. The Rebels started by upsetting previously undefeated Air Force 34–13 on September 30 in the first time that ABC came to Las Vegas for the Rebels football game. The Rebels then ended a five-game skid to rival Nevada, defeating the Wolf Pack 34–13 in front of the largest crowd to see a game in the Battle for Nevada. The season went down to the wire as the Rebels had to pull out a 34–32 victory on the road against Hawaii to clinch their third berth in a bowl game. The Rebels were chosen as the Mountain West representative for the Las Vegas Bowl on December 20. The Rebels would continue their undefeated streak in bowl games as they defeated Arkansas 31–14 in front of a Las Vegas Bowl record 29,113 fans. They finished the season 8–5.

Before the start of the 2001 season, the Rebels garnered national accolades as the team was ranked No. 25 in Sports Illustrated's preseason Top 25 and No. 24 in Football Digest's rankings. Quarterback Jason Thomas was named a candidate for the Heisman Trophy, ranking as high as No. 7. Although the Rebels seemed good on paper, the team did not gel and ended the season a disappointing 4–7. On October 5, 2002, the Rebels defeated rival Nevada 21–17 for Robinson's 200th career coaching victory. Robinson retired after the 2004 season, having led the Rebels to a bowl game and five consecutive victories over rival Nevada.

On December 6, 2004, the Rebels hired Utah assistant coach Mike Sanford as the 9th head coach. In his first three years at the helm of the Rebels football program, Sanford failed to win more than two games and had back to back 2–10 seasons, finishing last in the Mountain West all three years. Sanford failed to beat Nevada all five years he coached at UNLV. Despite UNLV's troubles the program sent former Rebels Eric Wright and Beau Bell to the NFL draft.

The Rebels finished the 2008 season with a 5–7 record after starting the season 3–1. This was the best win–loss record UNLV had since going 6–6 in 2003. It also marked the first time UNLV did not finish last in their division since 2004. Their 23–20 victory over No. 15 Arizona State was the first time the Rebels had beaten a ranked opponent since 2003.

The 2009 season was a disappointment and it led to Sanford's dismissal as coach. UNLV was picked to finish fifth in the conference, but the team began to fall apart after a surprising loss at Wyoming. That was followed by losses at Nevada, against Brigham Young and Utah, and at Texas Christian and the Air Force Academy — games in which UNLV was outscored 243–81. They rebounded toward the end of the season and finished 5–7.

After the Air Force loss on November 14, the school announced Sanford's last game as coach would be the season finale against San Diego State. Former Montana head coach Bobby Hauck was named as the 10th head coach on December 21, 2009. Former TCU, Alabama and Texas A&M head coach Dennis Franchione was also interviewed for the position.

Before the 2014 Nevada Wolf Pack game, Bobby Hauck announced that he would be stepping down following the conclusion of the 2014 season. On December 10, 2014, the school announced that Tony Sanchez of Bishop Gorman High School would succeed Hauck as the 11th head coach of UNLV.

Sanchez announced his completed staff at UNLV on December 22, 2014, which would feature staff members from Nebraska, Colorado, Oregon State, USC, Houston, Georgia State and Bishop Gorman.

In 2016, a new domed stadium was proposed and approved for Las Vegas that would be the home to the Las Vegas Raiders of the National Football League (NFL) after the team relocated to Las Vegas from Oakland and the Rebels accomplishing UNLV's goal of replacing Sam Boyd Stadium. UNLV had been trying to get Sam Boyd Stadium replaced with a new facility since 2011 but had not found the funding to do so.

On September 2, 2017, the UNLV Rebels lost to the Howard University Bison 40–43 in Sam Boyd Stadium. Howard, a MEAC FCS opponent, was coached by Mike London, and led at quarterback by freshman Caylin Newton, younger brother of NFL star Cam Newton. As of September 2017, due to high off-shore point spread numbers, Howard's victory against UNLV is the biggest point spread upset in college football history.

On November 23, 2019, the UNLV Rebels defeated the San Jose State Spartans in their final home game at Sam Boyd Stadium, 38–35, in front of 17,373 fans in attendance.

On November 25, 2019, Tony Sanchez and UNLV agreed to part ways, taking effect after the team's final regular season game. He was replaced by Oregon offensive coordinator Marcus Arroyo who was announced as the new head coach of the Rebel football program on December 11, 2019.

On October 31, 2020, the Rebels opened their new home, Allegiant Stadium, against Nevada, losing 37–19.

Conference affiliations
 NCAA College Division independent (1968–1972)
 NCAA Division II independent (1973–1977)
 NCAA  Division I-A independent (1978–1981)
 Big West Conference (1982–1995)
 Pacific Coast Athletic Association (1982–1987)
 Big West Conference (1988–1995)
 Western Athletic Conference (1996–1998)
 Mountain West Conference (1999–present)

Conference championships
UNLV has won two conference championships. Their 1984 Big West Conference title was forfeited due to using ineligible players. They finished the 1984 11–2 and with a 5–2 conference record prior to the forfeits.

Forfeited due to ineligible players

Bowl games
UNLV has played in four D-1 sanctioned bowl games. 1 D-II bowl game. (Grantland Rice Bowl) 1 unsanctioned bowl game. (Yokohama Bowl)

† UNLV forfeited the original 30–13 win due to NCAA sanctions on ineligible players

UNLV traveled to Yokohama, Japan and palyed in the 1978 Nikkan Yokohama Bowl on December 2nd, 1978 against the BYU Cougars

Playoff appearances

NCAA Division II
The Rebels made two appearances in the NCAA Division II playoffs. They had a combined record of 1-2.

Head coaches
UNLV has had 13 head coaches in 50 years of college football.

Rivalries

Nevada
The Battle for Nevada

Nevada leads the series 29–19 as of the conclusion of the 2022 season.

Hawai'i
Ninth Island Showdown

Beginning in 2017, the annual game between UNLV and Hawai'i, 'Ninth Island Showdown' or, 'The Battle for the Golden Pineapple' gained a rivalry trophy when the California Hotel and Casino donated the "Golden Pineapple" to the winner of the game. Las Vegas, Nevada has long been a popular destination for Hawaiians for both pleasure and relocation, so much so that it has been dubbed "the Ninth Island", with the  Cal Hotel in particular aggressively marketing itself to Hawaiian tourists. Hawai'i is one of UNLV's two protected Mountain West Conference rivalries (along with Nevada) when the conference shifts to one division in 2023, meaning they will play every year. The 'Bows lead the all-time series between the two schools 19-13 as of 2022.

San Jose State
The Friendly Rivalry

San Jose State leads the series 19-7-1 as of conclusion of the 2022 season.  The rivalry stems back to the days when both the San Jose State Spartans and the UNLV Rebels athletics programs were both in the Big West Conference, in the 1980's. In the mid-1990's the Spartans and Rebels were both apart of WAC, Western Athletic Conference, and are division rivals in the Mountain West today. Recently dubbed 'A Friendly Rivalry' by some media in 2022 for the close friendly relationship Head Coaches Marcus Arroyo and Brent Brennan have.

Retired numbers

College Football Hall of Fame

John Robinson is mostly known for his 6 Rose Bowl victories and 4 National Championships while at USC. In 1999 Robinson was hired to coach football at the University of Nevada, Las Vegas. After a 2–0 start in 1999, the second win coming at Baylor, Robinson's first UNLV team finished only 3–8. The Rebels rebounded to win eight games in 2000, including a 31-14 victory over Arkansas in the Las Vegas Bowl, Robinson's only bowl appearance with the Running Rebels. In 2002, Robinson was chosen as the university's athletic director, but he stepped down from that position a year later to concentrate on the coaching position. In 2003, he was inducted into the Rose Bowl Hall of Fame.

Randall Cunningham was a 1983 and 1984 College Football All-America Team selection as a punter. In 1984, his senior year, he led the Rebels to an 11–2 season—still the school's only 10-win season ever—however this was adjusted to 0–13 when it was found out several players were ineligible.

National and Conference Awards

Pacific Coast Athletic Association

Big West Conference

Western Athletic Conference

'Mountain West Conference

All-Americans
UNLV has had 2- Consensus 1st Team All-American, 7- 1st Team, 9- 2nd Team, 3- 3rd Team, 1- 4th Team, 3- Honorable Mention,  1- Academic All-American and 5- Freshman All-American, in program history as of the end of the 2022 season.

Individual school records

Source:

Rushing records
 Most rushing attempts, career: 519, Dominique Dorsey (2001–04)
 Most rushing attempts, season: 274, Mike Thomas (1973)
 Shortest route to 100 yards, 4 attempts Shaquille Murray-Lawrence (August 29, 2013) vs. Minnesota Gophers
 Most rushing attempts, game: 36, Tim Cornett (November 21, 2013) vs. Air Force
 Most rushing yards, career: 3,700, Tim Cornett (2010–13)
 Most rushing yards, season: 1,741, Mike Thomas (1973)
 Most rushing yards, game: 440, Tim Cornett (November 21, 2013) vs. Air Force
 Most rushing touchdowns, career: 37, Mike Thomas (1973–74)
 Most rushing touchdowns, season: 20, Mike Thomas (1973)
 Most rushing touchdowns, game: 8, Tim Cornett (November 21, 2013) vs. Air Force
 Longest run from scrimmage: , Darin Brightmon (September 23, 1989 vs. New Mexico State)
 Most games with at least 100 rushing yards, career: >17, Lexington Thomas (2015-2018)
 Most games with at least 100 rushing yards, season: 9, Ickey Woods (1987) and Mike Thomas (1973)
 Most games with at least 100 rushing yards, season: 6, Kyle "Boomer" Toomer (1989)
 Most games with at least 200 rushing yards, career: 5, Mike Thomas (1973–74)
 Most games with at least 200 rushing yards, season: 3, Ickey Woods (1987) and Mike Thomas (1973)

Passing records
 Most passing attempts, career: 1,029, Randall Cunningham (1982–84)
 Most passing attempts, season: 506, Jon Denton (1996)
 Most passing attempts, game: 61, Jon Denton (November 23, 1996 at San Jose State)
 Most passing completions, career: 596, Randall Cunningham (1982–84)
 Most passing completions, season: 277, Jon Denton (1996)
 Most passing completions, game: 33, Jon Denton (November 23, 1996 at San José State)
 Most passing yards, career: 8,020, Randall Cunningham (1982–84)
 Most passing yards, season: 3,778, Sam King (1981)
 Most passing yards, game: 503, Jon Denton (November 16, 1996 vs. San Diego State)
 Most passing touchdowns, career: 59, Randall Cunningham (1982–84)
 Most passing touchdowns, season: 25, Jon Denton (1996)
 Most passing touchdowns, game: 5, 3 times, most recently by Shane Steichen (October 14, 2006 vs New Mexico) (also a Mountain West Conference record) Longest pass completion: , Armani Rogers to Devonte Boyd (September 9, 2017 vs. Idaho)
 Most games with at least 200 passing yards, career: 24, Randall Cunningham (1982–84)
 Most games with at least 200 passing yards, season: 11, Sam King (1981)
 Most games with at least 300 passing yards, career: 9, Jon Denton (1996–97)
 Most games with at least 300 passing yards, season: 6, Sam King (1981)

Receiving records
 Most receptions, career: 187, Damon Williams (1995–98)
 Most receptions, season: 88, Randy Gatewood (1994)
 Most receptions, game: 23, Randy Gatewood (September 17, 1994 vs. Idaho) (also an NCAA record)''
 Most receiving yards, career: 2,604, Earvin Johnson (2001–04
 Most receiving yards, season: 1,346, Jim Sandusky (1981)
 Most receiving yards, game: 363, Randy Gatewood (September 17, 1994 vs. Idaho)
 Most touchdown receptions, career: 24, Henry Bailey (1991–94)
 Most touchdown receptions, season: 11, Sam Greene (1980)
 Most touchdown receptions, game: 4, Henry Bailey (September 17, 1994 vs. Idaho) and Nathaniel Hawkins (October 30, 1971 vs. New Mexico Highlands)
 Most games with at least 100 receiving yards, career: 8, 4 players, most recently by Earvin Johnson (2001–04)
 Most games with at least 100 receiving yards, season: 8, Jim Sandusky (1981)

Rebels in the pros
 Isaako Aaitui – Nose tackle
 Waymon Alridge – Canadian Football League player
 Shaquille Murray-Lawrence -Canadian Football League
 Johan Asiata – Offensive lineman
 Glenn Carano – Quarterback
 Hunkie Cooper – Wide receiver/Defensive Back, an Arena Football League Hall of Famer.
 Randall Cunningham – Quarterback
 Randy Gatewood – Wide Receiver
 Joe Hawley – Center
 Rocky Hinds – Quarterback
 Robert Jackson – cornerback Cleveland Browns
 Carlton Johnson – Arena Football League player
 Suge Knight – Defensive End, better known as co-founder and CEO of Death Row Records
 Admiral Dewey Larry – USFL and CFL player
 George J. Maloof, Jr. – cornerback, better known as a casino mogul
 Kenny Mayne – Quarterback, better known as an ESPN SportsCenter anchor
 Rodney Mazion – American football and baseball player
 Keenan McCardell – Wide receiver
 Torry McTyer – cornerback Cincinnati Bengals
 Adam Seward – Linebacker
 Bob Stockham – Arena Football League player
 Frank Summers – Fullback
 Doc Wise – Arena Football League player
 Ickey Woods – Running Back
 Eric Wright – Cornerback

Future non-conference opponents
Announced schedules as of August 9, 2021.

References

External links

 

 
1968 establishments in Nevada
American football teams established in 1968